The Israel men's national lacrosse team is governed by the Israel Lacrosse Association. Their best finish was at the 2016 European Lacrosse Championship, winning the silver medal. Israel finished in 7th place at the 2014 World Lacrosse Championship. In both tournaments, England defeated Israel by one goal in the single-elimination round.

History
Israel became able to compete in international tournaments once the Israel Lacrosse Association was officially recognized by World Lacrosse in April 2011.
In preparation for its first major international tournament, the 2014 World Lacrosse Championship, Israel held tryouts in July 2013 at Wingate Institute in Netanya, selecting a roster of 46 men. The roster consisted of both Israelis and non-Israeli Jews from around the world, with the majority of the roster composed of Americans. Any Jew, due to being eligible for Israeli citizenship under the law of return may play for Israel in the tournament, based on the rules of World Lacrosse.

World Lacrosse Championships
Israel first competed at the World Lacrosse Championship in 2014, played in Denver, Colorado. Israel finished in 7th place out of 38 teams, after winning six of their eight games played.

Israel hosted the 2018 World Lacrosse Championship in Netanya.

World Lacrosse Championships record

2014 World Lacrosse Championship
Playing in its first-ever world championships, Israel very nearly duplicated Scotland's feat, twice narrowly falling in games that could have advanced the team into the Blue Division.  After reaching the quarterfinals, the Israelis led Australia in the third quarter before dropping a tough 9-8 decision.  Then in a placement round game, Israel made a dramatic comeback to push England to overtime before suffering a 10-9 setback. Israel finished seventh after defeating Blue Division squad Japan.

Standings

Results

Source:

2018 World Lacrosse Championship
Manchester, England was originally selected to host the tournament, but withdrew in May 2017. Instead, the championships took place in Netanya, Israel between 12 and 21 July 2018. This was the first World Lacrosse Championship played outside of the United States, Canada, England, or Australia.

On Thursday, 12 July, the Opening Ceremony and first games were held at Netanya Stadium, a 13,610-seat multi-use stadium which opened in 2012. It served as a home field for the 2013 UEFA European Under-21 Championship and features 36 luxury suites, a VIP seating area, and a modern press box. The stadium serves as the home field of Maccabi Netanya FC, as well as the temporary home of Maccabi Tel Aviv FC and Hapoel Ra'anana A.F.C.

From Friday, 13 July to Saturday, 21 July, the tournament games were played at Wingate Institute. Located on 50 hectares (125 acres), the Wingate Institute serves as Israel's National Centre for Physical Education and Sport. The campus doubles as both the State of Israel's primary university for the development of physical education teachers, as well as the nation's official training centre for national teams, the Israel Olympic Team, and national and international sports science conferences. The campus hosts the Israel Olympiada annually and the Maccabiah Games every four years. Wingate Stadium also serves as the home field for the Israel National Rugby Team.

Standings

Results 

The following 23 players were named to the squad for the 2018 World Lacrosse Championships.

European Lacrosse Championships
Israel has competed at the  European Lacrosse Championships since 2012. Their best finish was in 2016, winning the silver medal. Prior to 2012, Israel was unable to compete due to the Israel Lacrosse Association not being officially recognized by the Federation of International Lacrosse until April 2011.

European Lacrosse Championships record

2012 European Lacrosse Championship
During the 2012 Championship, Israel competed for the first time. Israel finished  in eighth place, out of 17 teams.

Standings

Matches

Quarterfinals

5th-8th place match

7th place match

Source:

2016 European Lacrosse Championship
During the 2016 Championship, Israel competed for the second time.

In the quarterfinals Israel defeated Germany 8–4 to improve to 6–0 in the tournament. Tied 2-2 during half time, Israel scored four goals in the second halfto give them the victory.

In the semifinals Israel defeated Wales 10–3. Israel had a 5–0 lead at halftime, and a 6–0 lead at the end of the third quarter. With the victory Israel improved to 7–0.

In the finals Israel lost to England 7–6. Israel originally leading 3–2 at halftime, held a 4–3 lead in the third quarter, before England went on to score four unanswered goals. With the loss, Israel won the silver medal.

Standings

Matches

Tournament bracket

Source:

Quarterfinals

Semifinals

Finals

Coach: Jeff SchwartzAssistant coach: Pete Ginnegar, Jordan Hirsch

Source:

2017 European Box Lacrosse Championships
The European Box Lacrosse Championships held its first championship event in Turku, Finland in July 2017. Israel defeated Czech Republic 8–7 to win the tournament.

References

External links
 

Lacrosse in Israel
National lacrosse teams
Men's sport in Israel
National sports teams of Israel